The  is a botanical garden located at 504 Kobuki, Mito, Ibaraki, Japan. It is open daily except Mondays; an admission fee is charged.

The garden contains a terrace, rock garden, lawn, water features, and greenhouses heated from burning waste in the adjoining garbage disposal center.

See also 
 List of botanical gardens in Japan

References 

 Mito Botanical Park (Japanese)
 Mito City Botanical Park
 Japan Science and Technology Agency entry

Botanical gardens in Japan
Mito, Ibaraki
Gardens in Ibaraki Prefecture